The Tuchin revolt (in French, the tuchinat) was a tax revolt of "workers and artisans" in Southern France between 1378 and 1384.

In 1378, the town council of Le Puy imposed an indirect tax on consumption at a flat rate in order to subsidise the war with England. According to a letter written after the revolt, when the tax was announced the people cried, "O blessed Virgin Mary help us! How shall we live, how shall we be able to feed our children, since we cannot support the heavy taxes established to our own prejudice through the influence of the rich to reduce their own taxes?"

The revolt spread west as people objected to heavy taxes to pay for the king's war. In September 1381, in response to unfair assessments for direct taxes, the workers of Béziers rebelled. A crowd stormed the town hall and lit the tower on fire, burning several councillors alive and forcing others to jump to their deaths. The Duke of Berry intervened quickly at Béziers, ordering forty-one rebels executed by hanging and four more beheaded in the town square as an example.

The Tuchins were eventually suppressed by the Duke of Berry  in 1384.

Notes

Further reading

Hundred Years' War
Conflicts in 1378
Conflicts in 1379
Conflicts in 1380
Conflicts in 1381
1378 in Europe
14th-century rebellions
Rebellions in France
Tax resistance in France
Conflicts in 1384
Conflicts in 1382
Conflicts in 1383
1384 in Europe
Military history of France
History of Auvergne-Rhône-Alpes
History of Occitania (administrative region)